Walter Lever Estate is a rural locality in the Cassowary Coast Region, Queensland, Australia. In the  Walter Lever Estate had a population of 49 people.

History 
Lever Estate State School opened on 2 November 1936 and closed on 15 March 1964. It reopened circa January 1965 and then close finally on 26 May 1967.

In the  Walter Lever Estate had a population of 49 people.

References 

Cassowary Coast Region
Localities in Queensland